Cerro Archibarca is a volcano in the Andes. Lava flows descend from a conical edifice. It was active 11 million years ago. The youngest deposits are eroded andesites on the northern side.

The red unit is formed from unconsolidated pyroclastics with spherical clasts ( up to ). Granite and pumice are materials also present in this unit. The upper white unit is a thick pyroclastic flow from Archibarca.

Andesites from this volcano are partly derived from crustal assimilation, with the crustal component constituting 40% of total rock. The Caballo Muerto and Archibarca ignimbrites may be derived from this volcano.

References 

Miocene volcanoes
Volcanoes of Salta Province
Volcanoes of Catamarca Province